Coolum State High school is a coeducational public secondary school based in Coolum Beach in the Sunshine Coast Region of Queensland, Australia.

Since 2017, Coolum State High School's current role of Principal had been held by Troy Ascott. The school also consists of four Deputy Principals, fourteen Heads of Department, two Guidance Officers, one School Chaplain, one School-based Nurse and six Heads of Year.

Academy programs

Coolum State High School offers the following Academy Programs to students of excellence:
 Academic Learning Program for High Achievers (ALPHA)
 Basketball Academy
 Cheerleading Academy
 Instrumental Music
 Surfing Academy
 Touch Football Academy
 Young Entrepreneurs

Curriculum

Junior secondary

Years 7 & 8 students at Coolum State High School undertake a set curriculum of English, Mathematics, Science, Humanities, Health & Physical Education, The Arts, Technologies and Japanese. Each student undertakes four 70-minute sessions of English and Mathematics per week, whereas all other subjects are undertaken in three 70-minute sessions per week.

Middle secondary

Year 9

Year 9 students at Coolum State High School undertake the compulsory core subjects of English, Mathematics, Science, Geography, History and Health & Physical Education. Elective subjects available to Year 9 students include:

 Art
 Business Studies
 Design & Technologies
 Digital Technologies
 Drama
 Food Studies
 Japanese
 Music

Year 10

Year 10 students at Coolum State High School undertake the compulsory core subjects of English, Mathematics and Science (Core Science, Biology, Chemistry or Physics). Each student also undertakes three elective subjects, which include:

 Aerospace Systems
 Business Studies
 Design & Technologies
 Digital Technology
 Drama
 Food Studies
 Health Education
 Humanities
 Geography
 Legal Studies
 Modern History
 Industrial Technology Studies
 Japanese
 Music
 Physical Education
 Psychology
 Visual Art

Senior secondary

Coolum State High School offers a range of Queensland Curriculum & Assessment Authority (QCAA) General Subjects, Applied and Vocational Education & Training (VET) subjects to students in Years 11 and 12.

QCAA general subjects

 General Mathematics
 Mathematical Methods
 Specialist Mathematics
 English
 Literature
 Business
 Geography
 Legal Studies
 Modern History
 Aerospace Systems
 Design
 Digital Solutions
 Food & Nutrition
 Health Education
 Physical Education
 Biology
 Chemistry
 Physics
 Japanese
 Drama
 Music
 Visual Art

Applied subjects

 Building & Construction Skills
 Essential English
 Essential Mathematics
 Industrial Technology Skills
 Information & Communication Technology
 Numeracy
 Social & Community Studies
 Visual Arts in Practice

VET subjects

 Certificate II in Community Services (CHC22015)
 Certificate II in Engineering Pathways (MEM20413)
 Certificate II in Health Support Services (HLT23215)
 Certificate II in Hospitality (SIT20316)
 Certificate II in Tourism (SIT20116)
 Certificate III in Aviation (AVI30316)
 Certificate III in Business (BSB30115)
 Certificate III in Early Childhood Education & Care (CHC30113)
 Certificate III in Sport & Recreation (SIS30513)
 Certificate IV in Crime & Justice (10283NAT)

References

External links
 

Public high schools in Queensland
Schools on the Sunshine Coast, Queensland
Educational institutions established in 1985
1985 establishments in Australia